Jalan Tanjung Karang–Bestari Jaya or Jalan Raja Musa (Selangor state route B42) is a major road in Selangor, Malaysia. The road connects Tanjung Karang in the west until Bestari Jaya (formerly Batang Berjuntai) in the south. It is the third longest road in Selangor state.

List of junctions

Roads in Selangor